A tray is a shallow platform used to carry items.

Tray may also refer to:

 Tray (given name)
 Jim Tray (1860–1905), American Major League Baseball player
 Tray Mountain, Georgia, United States
 Tray, a user interface feature similar to a taskbar developed for Microsoft's cancelled Cairo project

See also
 Trey (disambiguation)